The 1993 Tripura Legislative Assembly election took place in a single phase on 15 February 1993 to elect the Members of the Legislative Assembly (MLA) from each of the 60 Assembly Constituencies (ACs) in Tripura, India.

The Communist Party of India (Marxist) (CPI(M)), led by Dasarath Deb, won 44 seats and formed a Government in Tripura

Highlights
Election to the Tripura Legislative Assembly were held on February 15, 1993.  The election were held in a single phase for all the 60 assembly constituencies.

Participating Political Parties

National Parties
BJP (Bharatiya Janata Party)
CPI (Communist Party of India)
CPM (Communist Party of India (Marxist))
INC (Indian National Congress)
JD(B) (Janata Dal(B))

State Parties
FBL (All India Forward Bloc)
RSP (Revolutionary Socialist Party)
TUS (Tripura Upajati Juba Samiti)

No. of constituencies

Electors

Performance of women candidates

Result

Constituency wise winners

Government formation
The Communist Party of India (Marxist) (CPI(M)), led by Dasarath Deb, won 44 seats and formed a Government in Tripura

References

State Assembly elections in Tripura
Tripura